Glenora is a hamlet in the town of Starkey, Yates County, New York, United States. It is part of the Finger Lakes region.

Hamlets in New York (state)
Hamlets in Yates County, New York